David Wechsler (January 12, 1896 – May 2, 1981) was a Romanian-American psychologist. He developed well-known intelligence scales, such as the Wechsler Adult Intelligence Scale (WAIS) and the Wechsler Intelligence Scale for Children (WISC). A Review of General Psychology survey, published in 2002, ranked Wechsler as the 51st most cited psychologist of the 20th century.

Biography
Wechsler was born in a Jewish family in Lespezi, Romania, and emigrated with his parents to the United States as a child. He studied at the City College of New York and Columbia University, where he earned his master's degree in 1917 and his Ph.D. in 1925 under the direction of Robert S. Woodworth. During World War I, he worked with the United States Army to develop psychological tests to screen new draftees while studying under Charles Spearman and Karl Pearson.

After short stints at various locations (including five years in private practice), Wechsler became chief psychologist at Bellevue Psychiatric Hospital in 1932, where he stayed until 1967.

Wechsler was member of a 1947 mission to set up a mental health program and clinic for Jewish survivors of the Holocaust.

He died on May 2, 1981.

Intelligence scales

Wechsler is best known for his intelligence tests. He was one of the most influential advocates of the role of nonintellective factors in testing. He emphasized that factors other than intellectual ability are involved in intelligent behavior. Wechsler objected to the single score offered by the 1937 Binet scale. Although his test did not directly measure nonintellective factors, it took these factors into careful account in its underlying theory. The Wechsler Adult Intelligence Scale (WAIS) was developed first in 1939 and then called the Wechsler-Bellevue Intelligence Test. From these he derived the Wechsler Intelligence Scale for Children (WISC) in 1949 and the Wechsler Preschool and Primary Scale of Intelligence (WPPSI) in 1967. Wechsler originally created these tests to find out more about his patients at the Bellevue clinic and he found the then-current Binet IQ test unsatisfactory. The tests are still based on his philosophy that intelligence is "the global capacity to act purposefully, to think rationally, and to deal effectively with [one's] environment" (cited in Kaplan & Saccuzzo, p. 256).

The Wechsler scales introduced many novel concepts and breakthroughs to the intelligence testing movement. First, he did away with the quotient scores of older intelligence tests (the Q in "I.Q."). Instead, he assigned an arbitrary value of 100 to the mean intelligence and added or subtracted another 15 points for each standard deviation above or below the mean the subject was. While not rejecting the concept of general intelligence (as conceptualized by his teacher Charles Spearman), he divided the concept of intelligence into two main areas: verbal and performance (non-verbal) scales, each evaluated with different subtests.

References

Bibliography 

 
 
 
 
 
 
 

1896 births
1981 deaths
American people of Romanian-Jewish descent
20th-century American psychologists
City College of New York alumni
Columbia University alumni
American cognitive psychologists
Educational psychologists
Intelligence researchers
Jewish American social scientists
Romanian emigrants to the United States
Romanian Jews
20th-century American Jews
American educational psychologists